The 2011 IZOD IndyCar Series was the 16th season of the IndyCar Series and the 100th recognized season of American open-wheel motor racing. The season was sanctioned by IndyCar and was part of the Mazda Road to Indy. The season began in March and concluded in October, consisting of seventeen events.

It was the final season running the IR–05 Dallara spec cars, which had been the series' sole chassis supplier since 2007. It was also the final season running the Honda Indy V8 naturally-aspirated engines, which had been the series' sole engine supplier since 2006. The events took place in twelve states of the United States, as well Canada, Brazil, and Japan. The schedule featured ten street/road courses and eight on oval tracks. The premier event was the 95th Indianapolis 500, won by Dan Wheldon.

Dario Franchitti claimed his fourth IndyCar Series Championship title. He went into the final race of the season leading Will Power by 18 points. However, the race and the season were both marred by a 15-car pile-up early in the race that claimed Wheldon's life. The race was abandoned after 12 completed laps and the final points total reverted to the previous event, with Franchitti winning the title.

Rookie of the Year honors went to Canadian James Hinchcliffe, who led American J. R. Hildebrand in the rookie standings by 6 points going into the final race. Hildebrand's season was highlighted by a nearly winning the Indianapolis 500. His 2nd-place finish at Indy earned him top rookie honors for the race.

This season marked the end of several drivers' IndyCar careers. After 11-seasons, this season would mark the end of two-time series runner up Davey Hamilton's career. Hamilton would later partner with Sam Schmidt to form Schmidt Hamilton Motorsports a team that would last for two seasons, before changing to Schmidt Peterson Motorsports from 2014 onwards. Vítor Meira was another who made 2011 his final season. In his career, Meira set the record for the most podiums without a win, with 15. Paul Tracy would make an attempt to find a car for 2012, but was unsuccessful in doing so, making 2011 his final season in IndyCar also. Bertrand Baguette would shift his focus to sports cars for 2012, racing in the World Endurance Championship. Raphael Matos would only race until the Indy 500 and for 2012 he would switch to Stock Car Brasil. Danica Patrick would head to NASCAR for 2011 leaving an open seat at Andretti Autosport. Two-Time race winner Tomas Scheckter would make his final starts of his career across several teams in 2011. Scheckter currently resides in the United Kingdom. Buddy Rice would be yet another to make 2011 his final season. Rice collected three wins in his IndyCar career. Finally 2005 Series Champion Dan Wheldon. Wheldon would sign a contract to race for Andretti Autosport for 2012 driving the number 27 car, replacing Danica Patrick. Unfortunately, Wheldon would be tragically killed in a horrific accident at Las Vegas Motor Speedway that would also injure three other drivers, bringing an end to his 10-season career. 

This would be the final season for Versus broadcasting Indycar. Versus would be rebranded into NBC Sports for 2012, a name that has continued to this day (2022). ESPN would continue to also broadcast certain races as well.   

As of 2023, Dario Franchitti remains the last-ever IndyCar Series driver to won back-to-back driver's titles to date.

Series news 
The 95th Indianapolis 500 marked the third race of the three-year-long Centennial era, celebrating the 100th anniversary of the opening of the Indianapolis Motor Speedway and the 100th anniversary of the first Indianapolis 500-mile race.
 On January 11, the series made several announcements with regards to the upcoming season:
The governing body adopted the doing business as name of INDYCAR (all capital letters).  The legal entity remains Indy Racing League, LLC, and is specifically mentioned in the INDYCAR Rule Book.
The "restart zone" on ovals were moved from turn 3 to just before the start/finish line.
Restart procedures would mimic those of NASCAR, including double-file restarts, separate pitting for lead lap and non-lead lap cars, and the waving around of lapped cars that did not pit. The "free pass" rule would not be implemented.
Pit stall selection for each race would be determined by the qualifying order of the previous round at the track of the same type (e.g., road course or oval). Exceptions to this will be the season opener at St. Petersburg, which would be set by final entrants' points from 2010, and the Indy 500, which carries its own pit selection process.
On March 6, the series announced that the maximum field size for every IndyCar event this season would be limited to 26 cars, except for the Indianapolis 500 (which remains at the traditional 33) and the Las Vegas finale (34 cars).
 Firestone has signed an extension to remain as the series' sole tire supplier through 2013.

2011 IndyCar Series schedule 
 The 2011 schedule contained the following 18 races. Unless a flag is displayed, the race was held in the United States.

 Oval/Speedway
 Road course/Street circuit

 The São Paulo Indy 300 was started on Sunday, May 1, and was completed on Monday, May 2 following torrential rain.
 The Indy Japan 300 was moved from the oval to the road course at Twin Ring Motegi following damage to the oval caused by the 2011 Tōhoku earthquake and tsunami.

Schedule development

Existing contracts 
The São Paulo Indy 300 has a contract through 2019.
The Honda Grand Prix of St. Petersburg will continue through 2013. City officials look to extend the contract through 2014.
Iowa Speedway has been finalized a two-year extension through 2011.
Infineon Raceway signed an extension through the 2011 season.
An agreement has been signed with the city of Long Beach to extend the Toyota Grand Prix of Long Beach to 2015 with an option through 2020.
Barber Motorsports Park signed a three-year deal through 2012.
Mid-Ohio has a contract through 2011.
The Octane Racing Group, who promotes the Formula 1 Grand Prix of Canada and the NASCAR Nationwide race at Circuit Gilles Villeneuve, will take over as promoters of the Honda Edmonton Indy, having agreed a three-year extension. The race was announced as "canceled" on November 3, 2010, due to an impasse in negotiations between the race promoters and the city of Edmonton. However, negotiations to revive the race restarted the next week. On November 26, 2010, the Edmonton, Alberta city council voted to restore the Honda Edmonton Indy using extra funding from private sources and new parking revenue. INDYCAR officially announced the race's return to the schedule on January 11, 2011.

New or returning races 
 The Grand Prix of Baltimore made its debut on September 2–4, 2011.  The event took place on a 2.4-mile street course around the Inner Harbor and Oriole Park at Camden Yards. The contract runs through the 2015 season.
 A race at New Hampshire Motor Speedway in Loudon, New Hampshire returned on August 14, 2011, as an official announcement took place prior to the June 27, 2010 Lenox Industrial Tools 301 NASCAR Sprint Cup Series race at the facility. The track last held an IndyCar event in 1998 and has since been sold to Speedway Motorsports, which has IndyCar races at Texas, Kentucky, and Infineon. The original date was set for July 31, but was moved following the 2011 NASCAR schedule realignment.
The Milwaukee Mile returned to the schedule in 2011.
The season finale was held at Las Vegas Motor Speedway. The IZOD IndyCar World Championship would offer a cash prize of $5 million to any driver who wins the race from another racing discipline and/or is not an IndyCar Series regular.

Discontinued races 
 Chicagoland, Watkins Glen, Homestead, and Kansas—all tracks owned by ISC—would no longer host races this year.

Confirmed entries
 This chart reflects confirmed participants only. All drivers competed in identical Honda HI11R V8-powered, Firestone Firehawk-shod and Dallara IR-05 chassis.   reflects an IZOD IndyCar Series rookie.

Team and driver movements 
Chip Ganassi Racing: Dario Franchitti and Scott Dixon returned to the team for 2011. Graham Rahal and Charlie Kimball joined the group as part of a satellite team ran out of the raceshop of Don Prudhomme.
Team Penske: Shell and Pennzoil would join the team as an associate sponsor, motor oil partner and supplier for all three cars in 2011, replacing Mobil 1 and will sponsor the #3 car. Hélio Castroneves was signed to a multi-year contract that covers the 2011 season, and Will Power re-signed with Team Penske in September 2010. Roger Penske confirmed on November 12 that Ryan Briscoe would also be returning to the team. Izod was announced as being the primary sponsor on Ryan Briscoe's car and an associate sponsor on the other two cars.
Andretti Autosport: Tony Kanaan was signed to a multi-year deal with Andretti Autosport before the 2009 season, and his contract is supposed to run through to 2012. On the October 3 it was confirmed that sponsor 7-Eleven would not return in 2011, rendering Kanaan a free agent. Marco Andretti was in the second year of a four-year contract with the team in 2011 along with his sponsor Venom Energy. It was announced on October 29 that Ryan Hunter-Reay would return to Andretti Autosport through to the 2012 season. DHL has signed a multi-year deal to sponsor Hunter-Reay's #28 car. Mike Conway was announced on February 2 as the team's 4th full-season driver. The team has confirmed John Andretti in the #43 for the Indy 500.
Sam Schmidt Motorsports: Driver Alex Tagliani was in the second year of a four-year contract with the team. The team would also run cars for Townsend Bell and Jay Howard at the Indy 500, and for Wade Cunningham in three events. The team was committed to running a second full-time car in 2011, according to manager Rob Edwards. On March 1, 2011, it was announced that Sam Schmidt Motorsports had purchased the assets of FAZZT. Some FAZZT personnel would be retained for the 2011 season and Alex Tagliani will continue to contest all seventeen races.
Bryan Herta Autosport: The team confirmed Dan Wheldon for the Indy 500. Bryan Herta Autosport and Wheldon would carry out testing of the 2012 Dallara chassis in August and September 2011.
Dragon Racing: Tony Kanaan was announced as the new driver of the #2 car during a December 20 press conference in Brazil, however failure to secure sufficient sponsorship meant that Kanaan was unable to secure the drive. The team officially announced that they were shutting down on February 24, 2011; however following a restructuring, Jay Penske announced that Dragon Racing would continue with Paul Tracy for a limited schedule, as well as an Indy 500 entry. On May 3, 2011, the team confirmed Ho-Pin Tung would be the driver of the #8 Dragon-Schmidt Racing entry.
SH Racing: On July 28, 2010, VPX Sports announced a partnership with newly formed SH Racing, run by James Sullivan and T.J. Humphreys, for an entry into the 2011 Indianapolis 500 with the driver yet to be named. The team would be partnering with KV Racing Technology. On March 29. 2011 the team announced, South African veteran Tomas Scheckter will drive the #07 entry at the Indy 500.
Panther Racing: 2010 team driver Dan Wheldon confirmed in a Kentucky post-race interview that his contract expired after the 2010 season and he was unlikely to return to the team in 2011. 2009 Indy Lights champion J. R. Hildebrand signed a multi-year deal to drive the #4 National Guard car for the team. The team would field former Indy 500 winner Buddy Rice in a second car at Indy.
KV Racing Technology–Lotus: On September 28, 2010, it was announced that Lotus would provide sponsorship to two KV Racing Technology entries in 2011. On February 4, 2011, KV Racing confirmed that Takuma Sato and E. J. Viso would compete for the team for the 2011 IndyCar Series season. On March 21, 2011, it was reported that Tony Kanaan would join the team in a 3rd full-time entry.
Dreyer & Reinbold Racing: On November 11, Justin Wilson announced he would continue racing with the team in 2011. On March 3, 2011, the team announced Ana Beatriz would be joining Wilson full-time as the pilot of the #24 entry. The team also confirmed Paul Tracy for the Indy 500, prior to his signing to drive part-time for Dragon Racing.
Sarah Fisher Racing: SFR has signed Ed Carpenter for the 2011 season, who would compete in nine events. In addition, team owner Sarah Fisher has announced her retirement from driving to focus solely on team ownership.
HVM Racing: Team owner Keith Wiggins has secured sponsorship to return with Simona de Silvestro for the 2011 season. The team announced a three-year deal with Entergy Nuclear to sponsor an entry.
A. J. Foyt Enterprises: Driver Vítor Meira recently signed a two-year contract with the team through the 2012 season. The team would also field a car in the Indy 500 for Bruno Junqueira.
Dale Coyne Racing: The team announced two new drivers for the season: rookie Englishman James Jakes, who would run the full season; and Sébastien Bourdais, who would run at all road and street courses only owing to his Le Mans Series commitments. The team would still be fielding a second car at Indianapolis. On May 5, 2011, it was confirmed that Alex Lloyd would compete on all the oval races, as Bourdais won't.
Conquest Racing: On March 14, 2011, the team confirmed that Sebastián Saavedra would race for the team full-time during the 2011 season. On April 19, 2011, Conquest signed Indy Lights race-winner Pippa Mann to pilot the team's second car at Indianapolis.
Rahal Letterman Lanigan Racing: Entrepreneur Mike Lanigan joined the ownership of the team on December 17, 2010, and the team was renamed Rahal Letterman Lanigan Racing. The team would run the Indy 500 in 2011 with Bertrand Baguette.
AFS Racing:  On January 13, 2011, AFS Racing announced that Neil Micklewright would be joining the team as General Manager and Vice President of Operations. On March 12, 2011, the team announced that they would run an entry at St. Petersburg, and on March 17, announced that series veteran Raphael Matos will drive.
Newman/Haas Racing After the open test at Barber and months of speculation, Spaniard Oriol Servià revealed that he would race for the eight-time championship-winning team. Canadian James Hinchcliffe, runner-up in the 2010 Indy Lights championship standings to Jean-Karl Vernay was confirmed for the team's second car on April 5, 2011, for all remaining races.

Race summaries

Round 1: Honda Grand Prix of St. Petersburg 
Sunday March 27, 2011 – 1:00 p.m. EDT
Streets of St. Petersburg – St. Petersburg, Florida; Temporary street circuit, 
Distance: 100 laps / 
Race weather: , partly cloudy
Television: ABC (Marty Reid, Scott Goodyear, Vince Welch, Jamie Little, Rick DeBruhl)
Nielsen ratings: 1.2 rating, 1.840 million viewers (1.4 overnight)
Attendance: TBA
Pole position winner: #12 Will Power, 1:01.9625 sec, 
Most laps led: #10 Dario Franchitti, 94
Summary: The first race featuring the new double-file restarts takes a toll on the field as drivers adjust. On the first lap, a big collision involving several cars saw Marco Andretti flip over in turn 1, a crash he blamed on Hélio Castroneves. Several other drivers experienced contact on restarts, thinning the field. Dario Franchitti stayed in front for most of the race and won the season opener. Simona de Silvestro garnered the most attention of the later stages of the race, as she hotly challenged Tony Kanaan. Kanaan, who had landed his ride with KV Racing just days earlier, held her off over the final few laps for a surprising third-place finish.
Race Report: 2011 Honda Grand Prix of St. Petersburg

Round 2: Indy Grand Prix of Alabama presented by Legacy 
Sunday April 10, 2011 – 2:45 p.m. CDT (3:45 p.m. EDT)
Barber Motorsports Park – Birmingham, Alabama; Permanent road course, 
Distance: 90 laps / 
Race weather: , clear skies
Television: Versus (Bob Jenkins, Jon Beekhuis, Wally Dallenbach Jr., Lindy Thackston, Marty Snider, Kevin Lee, Robin Miller)
Nielsen ratings: 0.3
Attendance: 48,326 (race day), 79,811 (weekend)
Pole position winner: #12 Will Power, 1:11.4546 sec, 
Most laps led: #12 Will Power, 90
Summary: Will Power led wire-to-wire to take the victory. Twice Ryan Briscoe was involved in contact, first with Dario Franchitti, and later with Ryan Hunter-Reay. Following the race, second-place finisher Scott Dixon complained about Power "crowding" him on the restarts, but no penalty was assessed.
Race Report: 2011 Indy Grand Prix of Alabama

Round 3: Toyota Grand Prix of Long Beach
Sunday April 17, 2011 – 1:30 p.m. PDT (4:30 p.m. EDT)
Streets of Long Beach – Long Beach, California; Temporary street circuit, 
Distance: 85 laps / 
Race weather: , partly cloudy
Television: Versus (Bob Jenkins, Jon Beekhuis, Wally Dallenbach Jr., Lindy Thackston, Marty Snider, Kevin Lee, Robin Miller)
Nielsen ratings: 0.28
Attendance: 70,000 (estimated raceday), 175,000+ (estimated weekend)
Pole position winner: #12 Will Power, 1:09.0649 sec, 
Most laps led: #6 Ryan Briscoe, 35
Summary: With less than 20 laps to go, Mike Conway charged into third place on a restart. He quickly powered past Dario Franchitti and Will Power to take the lead. Conway pulled out to a six-second advantage, and led the final 14 laps en route to his first Indy car victory. For the second time this season, Hélio Castroneves was blamed for a collision, this time taking himself and teammate Will Power out of contention late in the race.
Race Report: 2011 Toyota Grand Prix of Long Beach

Round 4: Itaipava São Paulo Indy 300 presented by Nestle
Sunday May 1, 2011 – 1:20 p.m. BRT (12:20 p.m. EDT) & Monday May 2, 2011 – 9:05 a.m. BRT (8:05 a.m. EDT)
Streets of São Paulo – São Paulo, Brazil; Temporary street circuit, 
Distance: 75 laps / ; reduced to 55 laps /  due to rain and two-hour time limit.
Television: Versus (Bob Jenkins, Jon Beekhuis, Wally Dallenbach Jr.,  Robin Miller(May 1), Davey Hamilton(May 2), Kevin Lee 
Nielsen ratings: 0.51 (Sunday), 0.21 (Monday)
Attendance: 41,000 (Sunday)
Pole position winner: #12 Will Power, 1:21.8958 sec, 
Most laps led: #12 Will Power, 32
Summary:
Race Report: 2011 São Paulo Indy 300
Summary: Rain forced a postponement of the race after 15 laps. On Monday morning, the race resumed. Leader Will Power pitted for fuel on lap 36, giving the lead to Takuma Sato. With rain soaking the course, Sato's team hoped to stretch out their fuel window in hopes of a caution, and the possibility of leading the race when the time limit expired. Sato was forced to pit on lap 48, and Power retook the lead. The race ended after 55 laps with Power the victor.

Round 5: 95th Indianapolis 500
Sunday May 29, 2011 – 12:15 p.m. EDT
Indianapolis Motor Speedway – Speedway, Indiana; Permanent racing facility, 
Distance: 200 laps / 
Race weather: , cloudy
Television: ABC (Marty Reid, Scott Goodyear, Eddie Cheever, Brent Musburger, Vince Welch, Jamie Little, Rick DeBruhl, Jerry Punch)
Nielsen ratings: 4.0, 6.71 million viewers (4.3 overnight)
Attendance: 300,000
Pole position winner: #77 Alex Tagliani, 2:38.2613 sec,  (4-lap)
Most laps led: #9 Scott Dixon, 73
Summary: Ganassi teammates Scott Dixon and Dario Franchitti led 124 laps, but the race came down to the final few laps as several drivers pitted for fuel. Rookie J. R. Hildebrand took the lead with three laps to go, and led at the white flag. Coming out of the final turn on the final lap, Hildebrand hit the outside wall, and Dan Wheldon drove by to take the victory, which would turn out to be his last.
Race Report: 2011 Indianapolis 500

Round 6: Firestone Twin 275s
Saturday June 11, 2011 – 7:45 p.m. CDT (8:45 p.m. EDT)
Texas Motor Speedway – Fort Worth, Texas; Permanent racing facility, 
Distance: 2 races of 114 laps / 
Television: Versus (Bob Jenkins, Jon Beekhuis, Dan Wheldon, Lindy Thackston, Robbie Floyd, Kevin Lee, Robin Miller)
Nielsen ratings: 0.55 rating, (0.38 overnight)
Attendance: 73,000 (announced crowd)
Pole position winner: #77 Alex Tagliani, 48.6834 sec,  (Race 1, 2-lap qualifying); #82 Tony Kanaan (Race 2, draw)
Most laps led: #10 Dario Franchitti, 110 (Race 1); #12 Will Power, 68 (Race 2)
Race Report: 2011 Firestone Twin 275s
Summary: The popular "twin race" format from the 1970s and early 1980s returned to Indy car racing at Texas. Dario Franchitti dominated the first race, which saw only one caution. Wade Cunningham and Charlie Kimball crashed on lap 92, with Cunningham crashing Dan Wheldon's Indy 500 winning car from two weeks prior. At halftime, the drivers chose their starting positions for race #2 by a blind draw on a stage on the frontstretch. Tony Kanaan was the lucky driver who picked position number 1. Will Power picked starting position #3, but the winner of the first race, Franchitti, was mired back in 28th starting position. Controversy followed the race, as many in the paddock believed the blind draw was an unfair method to select the starting positions (many thought they should have simply inverted the field). The second race went without a caution, and Power went on to win. Franchitti was not a factor, but charged all the way to 7th at the finish.

Round 7: Milwaukee 225
Sunday June 19, 2011 – 3:00 p.m. CDT (4:00 p.m. EDT)
Milwaukee Mile – West Allis, Wisconsin; Permanent racing facility, 
Distance: 225 laps / 
Race weather: , scattered clouds
Television: ABC (Marty Reid, Scott Goodyear, Vince Welch, Jamie Little, Rick DeBruhl)
Nielsen ratings: 0.8
Attendance: 15,000
Pole position winner: #10 Dario Franchitti, 42.7766 sec,  (2-lap)
Most laps led: #10 Dario Franchitti, 161
Race Report: 2011 Milwaukee 225
Summary: Tony Kanaan led 33 laps in the second half, but crashed into the turn 4 wall with only 30 laps to go. Leader Hélio Castroneves was forced to the pits on lap 199 to change a flat tire, giving the lead, and the win, to Dario Franchitti.

Round 8: Iowa Corn Indy 250
Saturday June 25, 2011 – 8:00 p.m. CDT (9:00 p.m. EDT)
Iowa Speedway – Newton, Iowa; Permanent racing facility, 
Distance: 250 laps / 
Race weather: , overcast
Television: Versus (Bob Jenkins, Jon Beekhuis, Dan Wheldon, Lindy Thackston, Robbie Floyd, Kevin Lee, Robin Miller)
Nielsen ratings: 0.35 (overnight)
Attendance: 35,118
Pole position winner: #5 Takuma Sato, 35.6857 sec,  (2-lap)
Most laps led: #10 Dario Franchitti, 172
Race Report: 2011 Iowa Corn Indy 250
Summary: Marco Andretti charged from 17th starting position to second by lap 152. Andretti passed Dario Franchitti to take the lead on lap 157. After a pit stop, Andretti dueled with Tony Kanaan for the lead over the final 50–60 laps, with Andretti taking the lead for good on lap 232.

Round 9: Honda Indy Toronto
Sunday July 10, 2011 – 2:50 p.m. EDT
Streets of Toronto – Toronto, Ontario; Temporary street circuit, 
Distance: 85 laps / 
Race weather: , overcast
Television: Versus (Bob Jenkins, Wally Dallenbach Jr., Jon Beekhuis, Dan Wheldon, Lindy Thackston, Robbie Floyd, Kevin Lee, Robin Miller)
Nielsen ratings: 0.50 rating, (0.41 overnight)
Attendance: 20,000–25,000 (media estimated raceday)
Pole position winner: #12 Will Power, 59.5771 sec, 
Most laps led: #12 Will Power, 32
Race Report: 2011 Honda Indy Toronto
Summary: At least 18 cars were involved in scuffles and contact throughout the race, with six dropping out. On lap 56, Dario Franchitti clipped wheels with leader Will Power in the hairpin, causing Power to spin out. Franchitti slipped by to take the lead, and held on to win. Power was visibly upset because it was reported that race-control penalized Franchitti for it and reversed the penalty. However competition director Al Unser Jr. said he did not penalize Franchitti at all because it was a racing incident.

Round 10: Edmonton Indy
Sunday July 24, 2011 – 12:50 p.m. MDT (2:50 p.m. EDT)
Edmonton City Centre Airport – Edmonton, Alberta; Temporary airport course, 
Distance: 80 laps / 
Race weather: , clear skies
Television: Versus (Bob Jenkins, Wally Dallenbach Jr., Jon Beekhuis, Robbie Floyd, Lindy Thackston, Kevin Lee, Robin Miller)
Nielsen ratings: 0.6
Attendance:
Pole position winner: #5 Takuma Sato, 1:18.5165 sec, 
Most laps led: #12 Will Power, 57
Race Report: 2011 Edmonton Indy
Summary: The race took place on a new layout for 2011. On the first lap, Alex Tagliani made contact with Graham Rahal as the field negotiated the tight turn 5, which took out four cars. Later in the race, Ryan Hunter-Reay tangled with polesitter Takuma Sato, also in turn 5. Will Power took the lead on lap 20, and Penske managed a 1-2 finish.

Round 11: Honda Indy 200
Sunday August 7, 2011 – 2:50 p.m. EDT
Mid-Ohio Sports Car Course – Lexington, Ohio; Permanent racing facility, 
Distance: 85 laps / 
Race weather: , partly cloudy
Television: Versus (Bob Jenkins, Wally Dallenbach Jr., Jon Beekhuis, Marty Snider, Lindy Thackston, Kevin Lee, Robin Miller)
Nielsen ratings: 0.2
Attendance:
Pole position winner: #9 Scott Dixon, 1:08.0776 sec, 
Most laps led: #9 Scott Dixon, 50
Race Report: 2011 Honda Indy 200
Summary: Scott Dixon edged teammate Dario Franchitti down the backstretch on a restart on lap 61, and held on to win at Mid-Ohio for the third time in five seasons. Will Power dropped to 14th after getting caught out under a full-course caution during a sequence of pit stops.

Round 12: MoveThatBlock.com Indy 225
Sunday August 14, 2011 – 3:30 p.m. EDT
New Hampshire Motor Speedway – Loudon, New Hampshire; Permanent racing facility, 
Distance: 225 laps / ; reduced to 215 laps /  due to rain
Race weather: , cloudy
Television: ABC (Marty Reid, Scott Goodyear, Gary Gerould, Jamie Little, Rick DeBruhl)
Nielsen ratings: 0.9 (overnight)
Attendance: 30,000
Pole position winner: #10 Dario Franchitti, 43.1976 sec,  (2-lap)
Most laps led: #10 Dario Franchitti, 115
Race Report: 2011 MoveThatBlock.com Indy 225
Summary:
Indy car racing returned to New Hampshire after a 13-year sabbatical. Dario Franchitti dominated the first half, but on a restart on lap 118, he touched wheels with Takuma Sato and crashed into the inside wall. On lap 206, the caution came out for rain, with Ryan Hunter-Reay leading. Despite the drivers pleading to their crews that the track was too wet to continue, officials decided to bring the green flag out with 7 laps to go. As the field accelerated, Danica Patrick spun on the frontstretch due to the wet conditions, which led to a controversial five-car pileup, involving championship contender Will Power among others. During the restart attempt, Oriol Servià passed Hunter-Reay as the restart began but before the caution was signaled, leading to controversy when the decision was made to abort the restart, a move common in USAC when a false start occurs, which typically means the cars return to their starting order for another start attempt. Officials accepted blame for the decision and red flagged the race. Scoring was reverted to the standings prior to the restart attempt.

Within 30 minutes of the end of the race, Newman/Haas Racing and Chip Ganassi Racing filed protests regarding the finish of the race because of Servià's pass of Hunter-Reay on the aborted restart. The results of the race were not made official, and as a result of the protest, the finish was under review. Indy Racing League, LLC announced on August 16 that a hearing was scheduled for the week of August 22 on both protests filed, and the hearing would also include Andretti Autosport, as the results of the hearing may have resulted in the finishing order being changed. The hearing took place on August 23, with the finishing positions being upheld.

Round 13: Indy Grand Prix of Sonoma
Sunday August 28, 2011 – 1:50 p.m. PDT (4:50 p.m. EDT)
Infineon Raceway – Sonoma, California; Permanent racing facility, 
Distance: 75 laps / 
Race weather: , clear skies
Television: Versus (Bob Jenkins, Wally Dallenbach Jr., Jon Beekhuis, Marty Snider, Lindy Thackston, Kevin Lee, Robin Miller)
Nielsen ratings: 0.3
Attendance:
Pole position winner: #12 Will Power, 1:18.6017 sec, 
Most laps led: #12 Will Power, 71
Race Report: 2011 Indy Grand Prix of Sonoma
Summary: Will Power led 71 of 75 laps, as Team Penske swept 1st-2nd-3rd on the podium. It was the first 1-2-3 finish in an Indycar race for Penske since Nazareth in 1994. Power closed to within 26 points of championship leader Dario Franchitti. Power also closed within 7 points of Franchitti for the Mario Andretti Road Course Trophy. Simon Pagenaud substituted for Simona de Silvestro after she had complications renewing her visa, and U.S. Customs would not allow her into the country.

Round 14: Baltimore Grand Prix
Sunday September 4, 2011 – 2:45 p.m. EDT
Streets of Baltimore – Baltimore, Maryland; Temporary street circuit, 
Distance: 75 laps / 
Race weather: , scattered clouds
Television: Versus (Bob Jenkins, Wally Dallenbach Jr., Jon Beekhuis, Marty Snider, Lindy Thackston, Kevin Lee, Robin Miller)
Nielsen ratings: 0.6
Attendance: 75,000 (estimated raceday), 150,000+ (estimated weekend)
Pole position winner: #12 Will Power, 1:20.2447 sec, 
Most laps led: #12 Will Power, 70
Race Report: 2011 Baltimore Grand Prix
Summary: The inaugural IndyCar race in Baltimore saw a large crowd, and a challenging course, with many deeming the race a popular success. Will Power led 70 of 75 laps en route to a dominating victory, closing the points lead to only 5 points with three races remaining. During practice, Tony Kanaan lost his brakes, touched wheels with Hélio Castroneves' car, and jumped over his car into the tire barrier. Kanaan was unhurt, but was forced to start the race from the rear in a back-up car, which he drove to a 3rd-place finish. On lap 38, Ryan Briscoe clipped Ryan Hunter-Reay's car in the hairpin, creating a chain reaction pileup that involved or blocked as many as 18 cars.

Round 15: Indy Japan: The Final
Sunday September 18, 2011 – 1:00 p.m. JST (12:00 a.m. EDT)
Twin Ring Motegi – Motegi, Tochigi; Permanent racing facility, 
Distance: 63 laps / 
Race weather: , scattered clouds
Television: Versus (Bob Jenkins, Wally Dallenbach Jr., Jon Beekhuis, Kevin Lee)
Nielsen ratings: 0.50
Attendance:
Pole position winner: #9 Scott Dixon, 1:38.3918 sec, 
Most laps led: #9 Scott Dixon, 62
Race Report: 2011 Indy Japan: The Final
Summary: Scott Dixon led 62 of 63 laps, dominating the final Indycar race at Twin Ring Motegi. Following the 2011 earthquake and tsunami in Japan, the race was moved to the 2.98 mile road course due to damage to the oval. On lap 26, points leader Dario Franchitti tangled with Ryan Briscoe, causing a spin that also collected Graham Rahal. Franchitti was penalized for the move, and sent to the rear of the field. He worked his way back up to an 8th-place finish. Will Power's second-place finish allowed him to clinch the 2011 Mario Andretti Road Course Trophy, and took the lead (+5 points) in the overall points standing with two races left.

Round 16: Kentucky Indy 300
Sunday October 2, 2011 – 2:45 p.m. EDT
Kentucky Speedway – Sparta, Kentucky; Permanent racing facility, 
Distance: 200 laps / 
Race weather: , partly cloudy
Television: Versus (Bob Jenkins, Wally Dallenbach Jr., Jon Beekhuis, Marty Snider, Kevin Lee, Lindy Thackston, Robin Miller)
Nielsen ratings: 0.43
Attendance:
Pole position winner: #12 Will Power, 48.5948 sec,  (2-lap)
Most laps led: #10 Dario Franchitti, 143
Race Report: 2011 Kentucky Indy 300
Race Summary: Ed Carpenter battled Dario Franchitti side by side over the final 20 laps, and held off Franchitti to earn his first-career IndyCar Series victory. Polesitter Will Power entered the race with the championship lead – 11 points over Franchitti – and led the first 48 laps. However, during a pit stop on lap 49, Ana Beatriz made contact with his car as she was exiting her pit stall, ripping a gash in Power's sidepod. Power came home in 19th, and second-place Franchitti took over the points lead going into the final race of the season.

Round 17: IZOD IndyCar World Championship
Sunday October 16, 2011 – 12:45 p.m. PDT (3:45 p.m. EDT)
Las Vegas Motor Speedway – Clark County, Nevada; Permanent racing facility, 
Distance: 200 laps / 
Race weather: , partly cloudy
Television: ABC (Marty Reid, Scott Goodyear, Eddie Cheever, Vince Welch, Jamie Little, Rick DeBruhl)
Nielsen ratings: 1.6
Attendance: 50,000 (Sunday – two races), 75,000 (total; includes Smith's 350 NASCAR Camping World Truck Series race on Saturday).
Pole position winner: #82 Tony Kanaan, 50.0582 sec,  (2-lap)
Most laps led: Tony Kanaan (race abandoned)
Race Report: 2011 IZOD IndyCar World Championship
Summary: The race was marred by a 15-car pileup on the 11th lap and four drivers – Dan Wheldon, Will Power, J. R. Hildebrand and Pippa Mann – were taken to the hospital while the race was red-flagged. The race was abandoned two hours later with the announcement that Wheldon had died from his injuries, and the remaining drivers completed a five-lap salute to honor Wheldon's memory. Power was later released from the hospital, while Mann and Hildebrand were kept under observation, but were later released. Mann suffered a burn to her hand and Hildebrand suffered a bruised sternum. IndyCar does not use the FIA Code on race stoppages (which states a race is official once a race is on the fourth lap) and uses the customary 50% plus one lap rule (101 laps in this case). The race results were stricken from the record book, and the statistics did not count. Franchitti was declared the series champion, although he would have won the championship anyway had the race continued since Power suffered injuries in the crash.

Season summary

Race results

Final driver standings 

 Extra points awarded for qualifying at Indianapolis based on drivers performance.
 Texas is split into two races on the same day. Each one awards half points.
 Ties in points broken by number of wins, followed by number of 2nds, 3rds, etc., and then by number of pole positions, followed by number of times qualified 2nd, etc.

Notes
 After qualifying for the Indianapolis 500 had concluded, Bruno Junqueira was replaced by Ryan Hunter-Reay, who did not qualify for the 500. Junqueira received full qualifying points for a 19th place qualification.
 At the Las Vegas Indy 300, Dan Wheldon died from injuries sustained in a 15-car crash on lap 11. The race was abandoned, the results were stricken from the record book, and the statistics did not count.

See also 
 2011 Indianapolis 500

Footnotes

References

External links 
 Versus IndyCar Schedule

IndyCar Series seasons
IndyCar
 
IndyCar Series